Papilio chrapkowskii, the broad green-banded swallowtail or Chrapkowski's green-banded swallowtail, is a species of swallowtail butterfly from the genus Papilio that is found in Uganda, Kenya and Tanzania.

The larvae feed on Vepris species.

Description
The ground colour is black and the light areas greenish blue. The submarginal spots on forewings below are well developed. The hindwing verso is strongly mottled with silky purplish brown.The blue spot in the cell of the forewing above reaches basad  about to the middle of cellule 2; forewing beneath with large yellowish submarginal spots in cellules 1 b—4. British East Africa: Nairobi.

Taxonomy

Papilio chrapkowskii belongs to a clade called the nireus species group with 15 members.  The pattern is  black with green or blue bands and spots and the butterflies, although called swallowtails lack tails with the exception of this species Papilio charopus and Papilio hornimani.  The clade members are:

Papilio aristophontes Oberthür, 1897
Papilio nireus Linnaeus, 1758 
Papilio charopus  Westwood, 1843
Papilio chitondensis de Sousa & Fernandes, 1966 
Papilio chrapkowskii  Suffert, 1904 
Papilio chrapkowskoides Storace, 1952 
Papilio desmondi van Someren, 1939 
Papilio hornimani Distant, 1879 
Papilio interjectana Vane-Wright, 1995
Papilio manlius Fabricius, 1798
Papilio microps Storace, 1951 
Papilio sosia Rothschild & Jordan, 1903
Papilio thuraui Karsch, 1900
Papilio ufipa Carcasson, 1961
Papilio wilsoni Rothschild, 1926

Description
It is smaller than Papilio bromius with the blue band narrower. Submarginal spots on the forewing are below well developed. Hindwing below strongly mottled with silky purplish brown.

References

chrapkowskii
Butterflies described in 1904